In ornithology, the facial disc is the concave collection of feathers on the face of some birds—most notably owls—surrounding the eyes. The concavity of the facial disc forms a circular paraboloid that collects sound waves and directs those waves towards the owl's ears. The feathers making up this disc can be adjusted by the bird to alter the focal length of this sound collector, enabling the bird to focus at different distances and allowing it to locate prey by sound alone under snow, grass, and plant cover.

Other bird species, such as harriers, have less prominent facial discs. In harriers, the related term facial ruff refers to feathers around the neck that are raised in response to noise, essentially enlarging the facial disc and improving hearing.

The barn owl has the most visually prominent facial disc, measuring about 110 mm (Simmons), while the great grey owl has the largest disc of any bird.

References 
 Jemima Parry-Jones (2001). Understanding Owls: Biology, Management, Breeding, Training. David & Charles, p. 20. 
 Robert E. Simmons (2000). Harriers of the World: Their Behaviour and Ecology. Oxford University Press, pp. 53–56. 
 U.R. Koch, H. Wagner (2002). Morphometry of Auricular Feathers of Barn Owls (Tyto alba). European Journal of Morphology, Vol. 40, No. 1, pp. 15–21

Bird anatomy
Owls